A Briefer  History of Time is a 2006 popular-science book by the English physicist Stephen Hawking and the American physicist Leonard Mlodinow.

Overview
The book is an update and rewrite of Hawking's 1988 A Brief History of Time. In this book Hawking and Mlodinow present quantum mechanics, string theory, the big bang theory, and other topics in a more accessible fashion to the general public. The book is updated with newly discovered topics, and informs of recurring subjects throughout the book in greater detail.

References 

2005 non-fiction books
Collaborative non-fiction books
Books by Stephen Hawking
Popular physics books
Cosmology books
Bantam Books books